Arhatha is a 1990 Indian Malayalam film, directed by I. V. Sasi and produced by P. K. R. Pillai. The film stars Mohanlal, Urvashi, Rekha and Suresh Gopi in the lead roles. The film has musical score by Shyam.

Plot

The story revolves around a chemical factory where Krishnadas and his son Mahesh rule the factory with the help of all the bad elements in society. They are corrupted politicians including Ex-minister Unnithan, police officers including the commissioner  to local criminals led by the notorious Cheku. Devaraj arrives at the scene after he received an offer from the factory where his father, Rtd. captain Ramakrishnan  served as the chief security officer and was brutally murdered while on duty.

Cast
 
Mohanlal as Devaraj 
Urvashi as Aswathi 
Rekha as Anju 
Suresh Gopi as Mahesh 
Captain Raju as Shekhu 
M. G. Soman as Chandrashekharan Nair 
Lalu Alex as Sethu 
Kuthiravattam Pappu as Nambiar 
Jagathy Sreekumar as Unni Unnithan 
Janardhanan as Krishnakumar
Sukumari as Devamma 
K. P. Ummer as Sreedharan Unnithan 
K. P. A. C. Sunny as Commissioner Sreenivasan 
Usha as Sindhu 
Unnimary as Ammini 
Thikkurissy Sukumaran Nair as Ashwathi's Grandfather 
Kundara Johny as Achu 
Balan K. Nair as "Udumbu" Nanu 
Bheeman Raghu as Siddique 
Jagannatha Varma as C. K. Ramakrishnan 
Ramu as Mohammad
Shanavas as Prasad
Shyama as Devaraj's Sister
Prathapachandran as Advocate
Thodupuzha Vasanthi

References

External links
 

1990 films
1990s Malayalam-language films
Films scored by Shyam (composer)
Films directed by I. V. Sasi